Sapiens International Corporation is a publicly traded company, headquartered in Israel, that develops computer software for the insurance industry,

Sapiens' shares are traded on the NASDAQ Capital Market and on the Tel Aviv Stock Exchange. As of July 2022, the company has a market cap of $1.39 billion.

History 
Sapiens grew out of an initiative, dubbed DB1, undertaken by a group of scientists from the Weizmann Institute of Science during the 1970s to develop a novel object-oriented application generator for use with mainframe computers. One of the driving forces behind the initiative was Tsvi Misinai, a graduate of the Technion, who in 1972 spearheaded the project. He teamed up with Shai Sole, Shmuel Timor and Eli Raban. By the late 1970s and early 1980s, the Weizmann team, partnered with a local Israeli company, Advanced Automated Applications (AAA, which was founded by Tuvi Orbach).

In 1984, the Weizmann team established its own company, which was later merged with AAA and joined by entrepreneurs Ron Zuckerman and Shaul Shani. The company severed itself from the Weizmann Institute and was incorporated under its new name: Sapiens.

In 1992, shares of Sapiens began trading on the NASDAQ exchange. By 1993, Sapiens had 900 workers employed at 33 branches around the world and a market cap of $340 million.

During the latter half of the 1990s, Sapiens focused on developing a business rules technology (eMerge) and legacy modernization products and services. The company was involved in updating information systems to deal with the Year 2000 problem and to adapt systems to the changeover to the new single European currency (the Euro). In 1999, Sapiens' annual revenues reached $91 million.

Refocusing on Insurance Software 
In 2001, Dan Goldstein, then Chairman of The Formula Group, assumed the role of Chairman of Sapiens and supervised its recovery. The company decided to focus solely on developing software for the insurance industry.

Roni Al-Dor joined Sapiens as president and CEO in November 2005. Previously, he served for nine years as president of TTI Telecom after serving as vice president for three years.

Sapiens acquired Harcase, a Canada-based software company, developer of policy administration suite for Property and Casualty Insurance, in 2010.

In 2011, Goldstein executed a three-way corporate merger between Sapiens and two subsidiaries of Formula Vision – Formula Insurance Solutions (FIS) and IDIT.

Additional Acquisitions 
Sapiens has aggressively executed upon its merger and acquisition (M&A) strategy to expand its product portfolio, enter new markets and acquire technical expertise and skilled human resources. 
 Sapiens acquired IBEXI Solutions, an India-based provider of insurance business and technology in Asia Pacific, in March 2015.
 In July 2015, Sapiens Acquired Insseco, an Insurance Software Provider in Poland for $9.1 Million.
 In June 2016, Sapiens acquired Maximum Processing, a North American P&C solution provider that services tier-4 and tier-5 P&C carriers, MGAs, TPAs and brokers.
 Sapiens acquired U.S.-based StoneRiver, Inc. for approximately $102 million in February 2017. The acquisition significantly expanded Sapiens’ presence in the North American insurance industry, accelerating the company's footprint in the U.S. Property & Casualty space.
In October 2019, Sapiens acquired Calculo, a Spanish company selling core systems for Property & Casualty, managed services and consulting.
In December 2019, Sapiens acquired sum.cumo GmbH, a German InsurTech company for up to €28.4 million.
In November 2020, Sapiens acquired Tia Technologies who also sells insurance software from EQT Mid Market.

Product Portfolio 
Sapiens offers software supporting:

 Life Insurance
 P&C
 Decision Management
 Workers' Compensation
 Financial & Compliance
 Reinsurance
 Medical Professional Liability
 Digital Insurance Modules

See also 
 Tsvi Misinai
 Silicon Wadi
 List of Israeli companies quoted on the Nasdaq
 TA BlueTech Index

References 

Companies listed on the Nasdaq
Software companies established in 1990
Software companies of Israel
Israeli brands
Companies based in Cary, North Carolina
Companies listed on the Tel Aviv Stock Exchange
Israeli companies established in 1990